The Deep Eynde is a death rock/punk band from Los Angeles, California. Most known for their past theatrical live performances (which included colored plastic wrap outfits, real blood, fake abortions, live insects, worms, and an octopus suit) the band has grown in their style to encompass punk, gothic, death rock, psychobilly, and rock and roll. The band has since been an influence for the second wave of Gothic Bands in the United States.

History 
The Deep Eynde roughly began in 1989 by Fate Fatal (A Million Machines), after an abrupt departure from industrial band Kittens for Christian. TDE was originally three members, Fatal on vocals, Reverend Ryk on bass and Robert Lockerbee on Guitar, however after a year, that line-up changed to Killjo Zapata on Guitar, Oren Karpovsky on Bass, and Matt Callonna on drums.

The first TDE album was recorded with the help of engineer/producer Mike Rozon using six songs from the new line-up, while the remaining electronic-based songs including Parfumery were written by Fate Fatal, while keyboard arrangement created by Arlene Meyer. With the completion in place, this album called City Lights was released by German record company, Apollyon Antiphone. The album reflected the dark influences of Siouxsie and the Banshees & Bauhaus.

In 1995, another line-up change would bring in guitarist Daniel deLeon (of The Insaints Rezurex), and eventually drummer Hal Satan aka Juan Sermeno (of Penis Flytrap), the second album Suicide Drive was released. After years of touring the states, including being regulars at NYC's infamous CBGB's, the band regrouped to record the album which they are most known for, Shadowland.

In 2004, The Deep Eynde's third album Shadowland had caught the eye of skateboard legend Duane Peters and his record label Disaster Records, a subsidiary of BOMP!USA records. In late 2004, the first American release of the Deep Eynde hit the shelves all over the United States, making The Deep Eynde's biggest release to date, crossing into Punk, Rock, Psychobilly and Gothic.

Shadowland was picked up by People Like You Records in Europe in 2005 and immediately made the charts due to previous promotion in Europe. They began touring outside the United States more with concentration on European festivals. In 2007, The Deep Eynde released their follow-up album Bad Blood, which was also released on People Like You records.  They joined the Hellnights tour in Europe with The Spook, the Crimson Ghosts and Shadow Reichenstein. In 2010, The Deep Eynde released Spell*Bound on Cargo Records (Europe), which was a throwback to their original organic sound.  The band toured Europe for its release, with the highlight, a headlining position during the Wave Gothic Treffen 2010.

The Deep Eynde worked on their final release in 2014, while lead singer Fate Fatal began an electronic project entitled A Million Machines.

Line-Ups

Discography
 City Lights (1995), Apollyon Records
 Suicide Drive (2002), Apollyon Records
 Shadowland (2004), Disaster / Bomp Records
 Shadowland (2005), People Like You Records
 Bad Blood (2007), People Like You Records
 Blackout (2008), People Like You Records
 Spellbound (July, 2010), Cargo Records

References

External links
 Archives of their official website – on the Internet Archive's Wayback Machine
 

American death rock groups
American gothic rock groups
Horror punk groups